Lola Pearce-Brown (also Pearce) is a fictional character from the BBC soap opera EastEnders, played by Danielle Harold. She is introduced as the granddaughter of Billy Mitchell (Perry Fenwick) and Julie Perkins (Cathy Murphy), and an extension to the already established Mitchell family. Lola made her first appearance on 12 July 2011. Her storylines have mainly focused on her relationship with her family, a teenage pregnancy after a one-night stand with her cousin Ben Mitchell (Joshua Pascoe/Harry Reid/Max Bowden), fighting to keep newborn daughter Lexi out of care, her friendships with Abi Branning (Lorna Fitzgerald), Dexter Hartman (Khali Best) and later Frankie Lewis (Rose Ayling-Ellis), relationships with Peter Beale (Ben Hardy/Dayle Hudson) and Jay Brown (Jamie Borthwick), improving her situation by becoming a hairdresser, having an abortion after becoming pregnant by Jay, and being diagnosed with a glioblastoma brain tumour.

Some critics gave a positive response to Lola's introduction. Kate Woodward of Inside Soap said Lola's introduction had been a "revelation" and Tony Stewart from the Daily Mirror stated "in little less than a month on the Square, the spirited Lola has already created havoc." On 23 July 2012, Lola gave birth to her daughter, Lexi Pearce, during a seven-minute live segment, making her the first character to ever give birth live on EastEnders and the second character ever in soap opera. On 13 June 2015, it was announced that Harold was exiting her role as Lola after being written out of the show. Harold left the show on 28 July 2015. Bosses left the door open for her to return, and a return for the character was announced on 20 December 2018. Lola returned on 1 April 2019. On 15 June 2022, it was announced that Harold had been axed from EastEnders once again, with Lola set to leave in mid 2023.

Storylines

2011–2015
When Billy Mitchell (Perry Fenwick) and Julie Perkins (Cathy Murphy) decide to find the son that Julie put up for adoption as a baby, Dan Pearce, they discover he has died. However, they find that they have a granddaughter, Lola, who is in care. They visit Lola at the care home and witness a fight between Lola and another girl, believing Lola is the injured girl, but Lola turns out to be the perpetrator. She tells Billy and Julie that Dan hated them so Julie decides to leave. Billy hugs Lola before they go and Lola uses this as an excuse to steal his wallet.

The next day, she comes to Walford and returns Billy's wallet. She flirts with several locals, including Jay Brown (Jamie Borthwick) and Fatboy (Ricky Norwood). Fatboy allows her to clean cars for him but she takes one and crashes into it into Ian Beale's (Adam Woodyatt) chip shop. Billy sees this and tells her to run and Fatboy takes the blame. Lola visits Billy again and meets other members of his family. Julie tells Heather Trott (Cheryl Fergison) that she does not want Lola to live with them and Heather accidentally tells Lola. Julie feels that Lola is not their problem and Lola tells Julie that if Billy is forced to choose between them, she will win. Julie calls the police and has Lola returned to her care home, while Billy calls her "100% Mitchell". A week later, Julie finds Lola in the R&R nightclub and takes her home, after Julie apologies for reporting Lola to the police, and tries to get to know Lola properly.

Lola overhears Anthony Moon (Matt Lapinskas) and his brother Tyler Moon (Tony Discipline) insulting Billy, and in revenge, burns their father Eddie's (David Essex) stock. She gets a job at the café and admits to Liam Butcher (James Forde) that she started the fire. Lola starts stealing from the till at the café and short-changing the customers so Phil Mitchell (Steve McFadden) sacks her. She asks Phil for her job back and offers her mobile phone in payment for the money she took but he takes the phone and refuses to give Lola her job back. She takes revenge by smashing up his garage and destroying a car, unaware that Jay is under the car, and is badly injured. She gets Julie and when the ambulance arrives, Julie takes the blame. She is released without charge, while Lola returns to the care home but is persuaded to come back and Julie leaves Walford.

Weeks later, Ian oversleeps and Lola tells him that she has been waiting outside the chip shop. Mandy Salter (Nicola Stapleton) tells Ian to fire her, which he does but Lola soon persuades Ian to give her job back, by promising not to tell anyone about Mandy staying. She takes a liking to Jay's friend, Duncan Willis (Steven France) but later vandalises Grace Olubunmi's (Ellen Thomas) flowers. She decides to take up self-defence classes after Abi Branning (Lorna Fitzgerald) is mugged. Lola steals towels from the Booty beauty salon and tries to sell them but is caught by Roxy Mitchell (Rita Simons), who threatens to call the police. However, Lola convinces Roxy that she has shown ingenuity, and gains a job at the salon.

Lola asks her third cousin-once-removed, Ben Mitchell (Joshua Pascoe) how he knows he is gay if he is still a virgin. Subsequently, they kiss and Lola sleeps with Ben before confirming his sexuality; he is gay. Shortly after, Lola finds she is pregnant and tells Billy, who is angry. Lola refuses to name the father but tells Billy that she plans to keep the baby and wants him to bring it up with her. She later tells Ben that he is not the father. Billy takes Lola to see Pat Evans (Pam St Clement) about help, but Pat misunderstands and advises Lola to have an abortion, angering her. In December, Phil confronts Lola about a mystery file, thinking that she's been stalking him. Phil questions Lola, to the point where she steps backwards and falls down the steps to her basement flat. She is rushed to hospital and soon learns that she and the baby are fine. Lola receives a call to say Social Services want to visit, as there is a new social worker. Lola goes missing when the social worker, Harpreet (Danny Rahim) arrives, so Billy asks Abi to pretend to be Lola. Billy assumes Harpreet is there about the pregnancy, so tells Harpreet, who is impressed with Abi's speech about motherhood. However, Lola arrives as he is about to leave and tells him that she is Lola, so Harpreet says the trust has been lost and she may not be able to keep the child. After falling down the stairs, she realizes how much the baby means to her and later finds out the baby is a girl.

Lola begins working for Janine Butcher (Charlie Brooks) as a cleaner and continues working at the chip shop, until Lucy Beale (Hetti Bywater), sacks her. Lola takes revenge on Lucy by stealing chip fat from the shop and pouring it over cars at the car lot, making Lucy a suspect. When Lucy learns Lola is responsible, she calls the police and Lola is arrested. The next day, on her 16th birthday, she receives community service and a curfew, and has to wear an electronic ankle tag. Lola and Jay break into The Queen Victoria public house and get locked in after hiding in the back room. There, Lola opens up to Jay saying she will be a bad mother. Lola gets home just in time for her curfew, then runs back out and shares an illicit kiss with Jay, who is actually still dating Abi. She angers Cora Cross (Ann Mitchell), after vandalising her stock at the charity shop and later prepares for Billy carrying the Olympic Torch but realises she is in labour in McClunkeys, where Cora delivers Lola's baby daughter whom she names Lexi Billie Pearce, after her friend, Alexa Smith (Saffron Coomber). Billy witnesses the birth after successfully carrying the torch. When it is revealed, that Jay helped to cover up Heather's murder, Lola is at first wary of him, although she eventually forgives him. However, Billy is unhappy about them spending time together especially when Jay is forced to hide when a social worker turns up. Lola appears heartbroken when Jay says they should stop seeing each other.

When Lola gets a new social worker, Trish Barnes (Tessa Churchard), she becomes increasingly agitated after Trish criticises her care of Lexi. She later bumps into Alexa and pretends to live a party lifestyle. Alexa and her gang spend time with Lola but when Alexa picks on Abi, Lola defends her and rejects her old friend. Lola later reveals she has a baby, named Lexi after Alexa, shocking her. Lola celebrates her tag being removed but is threatened by Alexa and her gang, who attack Abi and threaten Lexi, resulting in Lola punching Alexa. The police are informed and Lola is arrested while Trish takes Lexi into care. Lola begs Trish not to and asks Phil for help, telling him that he is Lexi's grandfather. Lexi is taken regardless and Trish tells her that Lexi could be away for up to eight weeks. Lola gets angry so Trish tells her she could lose Lexi for good if she does not control her temper. Phil tells Lola that he will get her back where she belongs. Lola is happy until she discovers that Phil wants custody but she eventually agrees to Phil's plan. Phil comes up with a plan for Lola to marry Ben and conspires with Billy, who is against the idea. Lola refuses to marry Ben and Phil plans to tell Ben the truth about Lexi, against Lola's wishes. Phil does not tell Ben but agrees to help Lola so asks Sharon Rickman (Letitia Dean) to pretend to be his partner to help get Lexi. She refuses initially but agrees until she finds out that Lola does not know about the plan, angering Lola until Phil explains his reasons to her. Alexa drops the assault charge but Lola is devastated to learn that she will not get Lexi back. Lola worries that Phil's plan will fail after he tells Social Services that he and Sharon are no longer engaged, but Phil does become Lexi's kinship foster carer. Lola is devastated to learn that she will still only have three access visits a week, and Phil starts being controlling, calling Lexi "his" baby and not allowing Lola to provide for her. Phil also tells Lola who she can be friends with, disapproving of her friendship with Dexter Hartman (Khali Best). Phil decides to take Lexi on holiday so Lola seeks legal advice but agrees that Lexi can go. Lola makes a request in court to increase her access visits with Lexi, and Trish states that Lola has made good progress but Phil's lawyer tells the court that Lola is often late, brings age-inappropriate toys and is unable to handle Lexi's tears. The judge rules that Lexi will stay with Phil as kinship foster carer. Billy goes to speak to Phil, while Lola listens and hears Phil say that he will never give Lexi back voluntarily so Lola snatches Lexi and leaves. Phil, Billy and Sharon spend the rest of the day looking for her, eventually finding her at a playground. Lola goes home and Phil asks her to meet him later at his house. Trish is there and asks them if their relationship has broken down but Phil tells her that he is responsible for recent events and agrees to work with Lola to make the transition for Lexi to return to living with Lola as easy as possible. When Trish leaves, Phil allows Lola to look after Lexi, and starts giving her increased access. Phil is impressed when Lola acts calmly when Lexi is taken ill with suspected meningitis, though she is fine.

Lola notices that Sharon is acting strangely and finds her passed out when she should be with Lexi. When Sharon regains consciousness, she admits that she is addicted to painkillers and tells Lola that if she tells Phil, Lexi will go back into care. Phil also later catches Sharon unconscious and when she comes round, he confronts her and throws her out. Just before the final hearing to decide if Lexi should be returned to Lola, Phil learns that Lola knew about Sharon's drug addiction and calls her a bad mother before leaving the court building. However, Billy convinces him to do the right thing, and Lola is successful in getting Lexi back.

Lola develops feelings for Peter Beale (Ben Hardy), but the feud between his family, the Beales, and her family, the Mitchells, make them anxious about being together. However, they eventually force Phil and Peter's father Ian Beale (Adam Woodyatt) to accept their relationship. Peter moves in with Lola, Lexi and Billy and pressures her to start a career in childcare when she loses her job at the local salon. Despite agreeing to do the course, Lola starts her own business doing the locals manicures and pedicures and loves it. She becomes closer to Jay and admits how Peter makes her feel that she is not good enough for him. After an argument with Peter, Lola turns to Jay for support and he tries to kiss her. Horrified, she goes to run off but as she steps out into the road she is accidentally run over by Ronnie Mitchell (Samantha Womack). She is immediately rushed to hospital, where she is told she has concussion, but is discharged the following day.

Following the murder of Peter's twin sister Lucy (see Who Killed Lucy Beale?), Lola struggles to support him as he in turn is struggling to support Ian and the rest of his family. When Lucy's memory is tarnished in a Walford Gazette article, Lola approaches them and gives them an article of content of what she believes will paint Lucy in a much better light. However, her words are twisted and Peter believes that Lola did it just for the money. Peter ends his relationship with her, and moves home to Ian. After Lucy's funeral Peter moves back home with Lola and Lexi. Peter begins developing feelings for his ex-girlfriend, Lauren Branning (Jacqueline Jossa), despite her relationship with Dean Wicks (Matt Di Angelo). Peter ends his relationship with Lola after admitting he kissed Lauren. Although Lola wants to make the relationship work, Peter still declines and begins a relationship with Lauren after she dumps Dean. In September 2014, Ben (now played by Harry Reid) returns to the square for Phil's wedding to Sharon. Billy and Jay hide Lola after Phil wants Ben to meet Lexi and tell Phil that she is visiting an ill friend. A few weeks later, Lola returns to see Phil, however comes face to face with Ben.

While Lola is in the pub with Jay, Ben and Abi walk in and Lola is confused as to why Abi is being so cold. Ben walks over to Lola insisting she is a good mother and he doesn't want to take Lexi away. When helping Johnny Carter (Sam Strike) at The Albert, Lola insists she has nothing to do with Abi and Jay's break up and begins making friends with her. Abi then tells her that she is in a relationship with Ben, causing Lola to be confused and worried, so Abi becomes defensive and think Lola is stealing Ben away. Jay invites Lola to The Queen Vic where Abi tells Lola that Jay only invited her to get back at her. After Jay reveals that Ben tried to kiss him, Lola walks out of The Queen Vic and Ben denies his accusations. Lola questions if Jay was using her to try to make Abi jealous, but Jay reveals to Lola that he still has feelings for her. When Jay tries to kiss Lola, she rejects him, telling him that she does not feel the same way about him. Lola is excited when her boss Dean asks her out to discuss her future at Blades hair salon and dresses nicely, but Dean's concerned mother, Shirley Carter (Linda Henry), sends her away, worrying about Dean's reputation.

Lola is frustrated when newcomer Paul Coker (Jonny Labey) accidentally knocks her over in the street, but they become colleagues. Dean sacks Lola for being absent but Phil gives Shirley a large amount of money to secure Lola's job. Following Ben's arrest on suspicion of murdering Lucy, Jay is worried he will be arrested as well after he reveals that Ben mugged Lucy on the night of her death. Lola comforts and reassures him and then they kiss, leading to sex. They then start a relationship. Jay tells Lola he wants to leave because Phil has given the police Lucy's incriminating purse and phone with fingerprints on it. She is upset but Jay suggests she goes with him, which she does, taking Lexi with them. Jay calls Billy and reveals that he, Lola and Lexi are moving to Newcastle with Dexter. She returns briefly with Jay to collect more belongings, but Billy tries to convince her to stay and let Jay go to Newcastle alone, but Lola refuses. Billy tells Lola he is going to collect his daughter Janet Mitchell (Grace) so that they can all share their goodbyes, but Billy reports Jay to the police and he is arrested for robbery. Lola realises that Billy reported Jay moments after Jay's arrest, so Lola leaves for the train station with Lexi. Billy attempts to convince Lola to stay in Walford, but she says she could have a better life somewhere else and that she wants him to be proud of her. Billy and Lola share an emotional farewell and Lola leaves for Newcastle, taking Lexi with her. Although Jay plans to join her eventually, Lola later ends the relationship because she is now dating Dexter.

2019–2023
Lola returns to Walford in April 2019 along with Lexi and Ben. When the Mitchells have a celebratory drink in The Queen Vic, Jay and Lola have conversation in which Lola reveals she and Dexter are no longer together and agreed to a mutual break-up. It is revealed that Lola and Ben are only back to con Phil and Ben promises to give both Lola and Lexi some of the money. Lola reunites with Jay and they almost start dating again however, it is revealed that Lola is engaged to Ewan (Riley Jones). Jay rejects Lola and she decides to move back to Newcastle with Ewan but Ben manipulates the situation and Ewan leaves Walford. Lola tries to get Billy back with Honey Mitchell (Emma Barton) and schemes various times to break up Honey and her boyfriend Adam Bateman (Stephen Rahman-Hughes), although she is unsuccessful. She starts working as an Events Manager with Jay's girlfriend Ruby Allen (Louisa Lytton) and the two eventually bump heads with each other. Lola becomes aware of Ben's schemes and warns him to end them, otherwise she will leave with Lexi. After Ben's plans to swindle Phil are exposed, Lola decides to remain in Walford and starts working as a hairdresser for Denise Fox (Diane Parish). During The Queen Vic siege where Hunter Owen (Charlie Winter) takes the residents hostage, Lola and Jay are locked in the bathroom together where they admit their feelings. They kiss and resume their relationship.

Lola is shocked when she finds out that she is pregnant with Jay's baby in March 2020. Jay is stunned when she insists for an abortion; proclaiming that it is too soon for them to have a child after Lexi. Their relationship hits the rocks when Jay proposes to Lola and she assumes he is only doing this to get her to keep the baby, and after a bitter row, she secretly ends up in a drunken embrace with Peter (now played by Dayle Hudson), recently returned from New Zealand. She goes to her abortion appointment alone the next day and is surprised afterwards by Jay, who tells her that he does not care about the abortion and only wants her to be happy; this prompts them to reconcile. However Jay notices tension between a flirtatious Peter and anxious Lola at Stuart (Ricky Champ) and Rainie Highway's (Tanya Franks) wedding in September 2020 where Lola is serving as bridesmaid. After confronting her Lola confesses to her one-night stand with Peter the night before her abortion which results in the couple breaking up. Lola is later furious to learn that Jay and Honey are in a relationship and forces them to tell Billy; he, however, refuses to speak to Lola after learning that she already knew about the romance. In February 2021 Lola is set up on a date with Isaac Baptiste (Stevie Basaula) by Kim Fox (Tameka Empson), which is met with opposition from his mother, Sheree Trueman (Suzette Llewellyn). Initially thinking it is because Sheree doesn't think she is good enough for her son she is later stunned when Isaac reveals the real reason is because he has schizophrenia.

In September 2022, Lola and Jay decide to rekindle their romance after they both realise they love each other, and will always love each other. They decide to keep their relationship a secret at first as they want to enjoy their time privately together, and want to be sure they're both 100% committed. However, it's not long before Lexi finds out. In October, after experiencing headaches and dizzy spells, Lola suffers a seizure while at one of Lexi's pageants. She is taken to hospital where she is revealed to have a brain tumour which is later to be incurable, leaving her and Jay devastated.

Creation and development

Casting

The character of Lola was announced on 7 June 2011 and she was created as an extension of the established Mitchell family. As she meets her grandparents for the first time, Lola quickly forms a bond with them as she has been deserted by everyone else in her life. Eighteen-year-old Harold was cast in the role and she said "I am so excited to be joining EastEnders. I have watched the show all my life and I never thought that one day I could be in Albert Square. It feels strange to be walking round Walford with people I have grown up watching—I still have to pinch myself.". EastEnders is Harold's first acting job and she was given the role following her first audition, which shocked her. Harold told Daybreak, "It was my first audition that I'd ever had, so I was really nervous and I was thinking, 'I'm never going to get it - I'm just going to have fun while I'm there'. I was just shocked to even get the casting for it, so I was over the moon when I actually got the part." Harold previously starred in Jamie Oliver's Channel 4 reality show Jamie's Dream School and got into an acting school because of the show. Harold said she had always wanted to be an actress and was grateful to be given a great character in Lola. Lola made her first appearance on 12 July 2011.

Characterisation and style
In an interview with Inside Soap, Harold said she was grateful for the complex nature of her character, saying, "Lola's not out-and-out evil but she's not very nice. She's got so many sides and I am having a great time exploring them." Lola is described as "a stroppy little 15-year-old, prone to fighting, tea-leafing and gobbing off." She is also "sharp, cocky but likeable." Of Lola's personality, the official EastEnders website said "Bright as a button but with a mouth that runs away with her, Lola is wild and definitely Walford bound. A self-reliant person who does what she has to do in order to get what she wants, she's not to be messed with."

Harold described her character as "feisty" and said she has got a lot of attitude. Daniel Kilkelly from Digital Spy, labelled Lola "rebellious", while the BBC said she is "a troublesome teen" and a "petite bombshell." BT described the character as "EastEnders' new tearaway and Billy's wayward granddaughter" and said "It seems Lola isn't exactly the butter-wouldn't-melt type. Surprise, surprise. Billy and Julie leave when Lola tells Billy she's not interested in the fact that he's her granddad, or that her dad's dead. What a lovely young lady." Virgin Media also branded Lola a troublemaking, teen tearaway and said she was "a chip off the Mitchell block." They added that she is a "blonde babe." Chris Hooton from the Metro branded Lola as "mischievous." Lola usually wears a tracksuit and trainers.

Storyline development
When Lola arrives she becomes embroiled in a love triangle with Jay Mitchell and Abi Branning. The storyline was summed up in Inside Soap by Kate Woodward who commented "Although I love Abi and Jay together, it's great to see them face serious obstacles thanks to her meddling. Lola is big trouble and has Jay is firmly in her sights. But he's in love with Abi. It was a brilliant idea to team moody Jay with good girl Abi. They work well as a couple, but with the interference of Lola their story has got even more interesting." When Phil Mitchell (Steve McFadden) begins to be stalked, the BBC named Lola one of the many suspects. However, the stalker is later revealed to be Ben Mitchell (Joshua Pascoe).

Pregnancy, live birth and motherhood

On 15 July 2012, it was revealed that Harold would become only the second actress to act out a birth during a live episode of a soap opera, following Coronation Street's Jennie McAlpine (Fiz Brown) in the live 50th anniversary episode broadcast in December 2010. An insider from the Daily Mirror stated "No-one has tried anything like this on EastEnders live before so it is a real challenge to get the emotion of the situation right. It will be the toughest thing Danielle has done in her acting career." The episode broadcast on 23 July 2012 and centred around Lola's grandfather Billy carrying the Olympic Torch across Walford. A seven-minute live segment at the end of episode showed Lola giving birth to her daughter, while Billy rushed to witness the birth.

Harold said of the rehearsals for the live section: "I have known about this live episode for such a long time but all of a sudden it has crept up on us. I am really nervous but now we have started rehearsing, I am feeling equally excited. It will definitely be an experience and I hope Perry runs smoothly!" She also said she was "terrified" of acting out the birth, saying she would prefer to give birth in real life. She said that filming the pre-recorded labour scenes meant she "was knackered after screaming and crying and pretending to push all day." In an interview with Digital Spy, she said that she was "really, really nervous" and that the prospect of acting the birth was "very scary", but added, "I really appreciate that they've given me the opportunity, especially considering that I haven't been here at EastEnders for that long. It's really nice that they've trusted me with it, so hopefully I'll do it justice! It's a once-in-a-lifetime opportunity, so I'm keeping my fingers crossed that it'll go well." To help prepare, she asked several women for advice, including her mother, and was told "It's the worst pain you can ever imagine!" She found it "quite difficult" to imagine what it would be live to act out as she has no children, but had watched Channel 4 show One Born Every Minute to help, as she did not want to "overdo the scene or make it look really fake."

In October 2012, Lola's daughter Lexi is taken into care.

Departure
On 13 June 2015, entertainment website Digital Spy revealed that EastEnders had chosen to write the character out of the show. They announced that Harold would be filming her final scenes within the following months and that show bosses are not killing Lola off, leaving potential for a return in the future. Harold praised her time on the show and the storylines she has been given: "I've had the most amazing time at EastEnders having been involved in some exciting storylines, including giving birth in a live scene." She also said how she would miss the cast and crew at EastEnders and how she looks forward to her acting future. Executive producer, Dominic Treadwell-Collins spoke of Danielle and her time on the square: "We all love Danielle and she and Lola have been a big part of EastEnders over the past four years. Danielle is a fantastic actress and I genuinely look forward to seeing her shine in future roles away from the Square." Lola's exit scenes aired on 28 July 2015.

Reintroduction
In May 2018, Harold expressed an interest in reprising her role as Lola, opining that Billy needed her character's support. She added that she would return if she was asked. Seven months later, on 20 December 2018, it was announced that Lola would return to EastEnders over three years since her exit. Upon her reintroduction, the character is billed as matured and "a fiercely protective mum" to Lexi. Harold expressed her delight at reprising her role, commenting, "I can't wait to get back and find out what Lola has been up to." Kate Oates, the senior executive producer of EastEnders, said that she "admired Lola's feisty, fiery spirit" and looked forward to her return. She added that it would create storylines for the characters related to Lola, including Jay and Billy.

Second departure (2023)
On 15 June 2022, it was announced Harold had been axed by new executive producer, Chris Clenshaw. It was then reported Lola would be killed-off after being diagnosed with an inoperable brain tumour, which was later confirmed in October 2022.

Reception
Harold's debut episode was watched by 7.68m viewers. Harold said that because of her performance as Lola she had received letters from children who had grown up in care homes, saying how much they love her character. Kate Woodward of Inside Soap said Lola's introduction had been a revelation. Woodward also commented on Harold's performance saying "In actress Danielle Harold, EastEnders have found a young star with enormous charisma, so you like Lola even though she's a nightmare! In the coming weeks, we'll see her really hold her own with the other Mitchells – which is no mean feat when you consider that most of them have been in this show for years." Woodward's colleague, Sarah, said she liked what she saw, after Lola's debut and described the character saying "She's got a surly attitude, and acts like she's tough as old boots. But something tells me that underneath that hard exterior is a lost little girl just waiting for someone to finally take her into the heart of their family."

Tony Stewart writing for the Daily Mirror described Lola as "a walking 15-year-old Asbo", he added "in little less than a month on the Square, the spirited Lola has already created havoc. [...] With Danielle Harold already tipped as a best newcomer in the next round of soap awards, stroppy Lola is either brave or stupid in taking on Phil." Metro's Christopher Hooton commented negatively on Harold's performance as Lola saying "Lola kept her world record attempt for worst acting in a soap going strong". Hooton's fellow writer, Rachel Tarley, said Harold's acting skills were "terrible" when Julie departed. During the love triangle storyline, Tarley said Lola was an "inept teenage seductresses." Co-star Perry Fenwick said that Harold is an "amazing" actress. A writer for Bang Showbiz branded Lola a "blonde babe".

Response to social worker storyline
The scenes where Trish Barnes takes Lexi from Lola were criticised by the charity The Who Cares? Trust on Twitter, who called the storyline an "unhelpful portrayal" and said it had already received calls from members of the public who were "distressed about the EastEnders scene where a social worker snatches a baby from its mother's arms". The scenes were also condemned by the British Association of Social Workers (BASW), calling the BBC "too lazy and arrogant" to get correctly portray the child protection process, and saying that the baby was taken "without sufficient grounds to do so". Bridget Robb, acting chief of the BASW, said the storyline provoked "real anger among a profession well used to a less than accurate public and media perception of their jobs". She stated:  Another social worker said "Accurate procedures were not followed [when a character's baby was taken away]. Was it police protection, section 20? Where was the immediate risk to the baby? As a social worker, I was in tears, as was a colleague of mine, watching how our profession was portrayed on television." The BBC responded to BASW by saying:

 A social worker who received the BBC's statement commented: 

In November 2012, Irish politician Robert Troy expressed concerns that the storyline could influence the result of an upcoming referendum on children's rights. Troy said, "Quite a few times I have been asked about a storyline on EastEnders where a young mother has had her child taken into care and has faced a very difficult battle to get access to the child. People have been emotionally affected by the story and have a real concern about the sort of heavy-handed state intervention that's portrayed."

Kate White from Inside Soap praised the storyline, saying, "Here you are teasing us all with endless mystery secrets and secret mysteries, yet the best storyline you have is hiding nothing at all! The simple tail of a young mum's love for her baby is heart-breaking and dramatic. All credit to actress Danielle Harold for being so brilliant as Lola. [...] Keep on keeping it simple."

See also
 List of EastEnders characters (2011)

References

External links
 

EastEnders characters
Television characters introduced in 2011
Fictional beauticians
Fictional characters with cancer
Fictional hairdressers
Teenage characters in television
Fictional characters involved in incest
Fictional teenage parents
Female characters in television
Fictional criminals in soap operas
Teenage pregnancy in television
Mitchell family (EastEnders)